Alan James Gough (born 30 April 1972) is a former English cricketer.  Gough was a right-handed batsman.  He was born at Ashby-de-la-Zouch, Leicestershire.

Gough represented the Worcestershire Cricket Board in a single List A match against Buckinghamshire in the 1st round of the 2002 Cheltenham & Gloucester Trophy which was played in 2001. In his only List A match, he scored 14 runs and took a single wicket at a cost of 30 runs.

References

External links
Alan Gough at Cricinfo
Alan Gough at CricketArchive

1972 births
Living people
People from Ashby-de-la-Zouch
Cricketers from Leicestershire
Leicestershire cricketers
English cricketers
Worcestershire Cricket Board cricketers